Trinity Catholic College is a large, co-educational secondary school and sixth form in the town of Middlesbrough, North Yorkshire, England. It is part of Nicholas Postgate Catholic Academy Trust.

Founded in 2009 following the amalgamation of St David's Roman Catholic Technology College, Newlands Catholic School FCJ, and St Mary's Catholic Sixth Form College, it is one of the largest Catholic secondary schools in the north east and the biggest in Teesside, with over 1,300 students on-roll.

The school is based on a multi-million-pound campus on Lacy Road, off Ladgate Lane. The campus includes a state-of-the-art main building and a newer sixth form centre. The campus opened in 2011 after over £24 million in investment through the Building Schools for the Future programme. In 2020, the school announced it would be further extending its facilities. 

During the summer of 2022 there was another major investment in new facilities as the school opened the T6 Football Academy, in partnership with Middlesbrough Football Club.

The school has been a member of the Nicholas Postgate Catholic Academy Trust since 2018, a multi academy trust which sponsors 27 academies across the Diocese of Middlesbrough, including St Peter’s Catholic College in South Bank, St Patrick’s Catholic College in Thornaby and Sacred Heart Catholic Secondary in Redcar.

The school’s current headteacher is Andy Rodgers, and the trust's chief executive officer is Hugh Hegarty. The chair of governors is Vicky White.

The school bears the name of the Holy Trinity, a key doctrine of the Catholic Church, while its five houses each commemorate an English martyr or saint of the Church; the Blessed Nicholas Postgate, the Venerable St Bede, St Hilda of Whitby, St Margaret Clitherow, and St John Fisher.

The school operates a vertical tutor system, where each child belongs to a House, rather than a year group.

References

External links
 Trinity Catholic College homepage

Secondary schools in Middlesbrough
Catholic secondary schools in the Diocese of Middlesbrough
Educational institutions established in 2009
2009 establishments in England
Academies in Middlesbrough